This is a list of wars involving the Republic of Lebanon.

Other armed conflicts involving Lebanon
Hundred Days' War (part of the Lebanese Civil War)
1978 South Lebanon conflict (also known as Operation Litani, part of the Lebanese Civil War)
Battle of Zahleh (part of the Lebanese Civil War)
Mountain War (part of the Lebanese Civil War)
War of the Camps (part of the Lebanese Civil War)
1982 Lebanon War (part of the Lebanese Civil War)
Cedar Revolution 2005
2008 Lebanon conflict (conflict between supporters and opposers of the government of Fouad Siniora)
17 October Revolution (Ongoing)

References

 
Lebanon
Lebanon-related lists
Lebanon politics-related lists